Vid Koderman (born 18 April 2003) is a Slovenian footballer who plays for Slovenian PrvaLiga side Koper as a left-back.

References

2003 births
Living people
People from Ptuj
Slovenian footballers
Association football fullbacks
Slovenia youth international footballers
Slovenia under-21 international footballers
NK Maribor players
NK Tabor Sežana players
FC Koper players
Slovenian PrvaLiga players